Binod Kumar Singh also known as Binod Singh Kushwaha was an Indian politician associated with Bharatiya Janata Party. He was the Minister of Backward & Extremely Backward Classes Welfare at the time of his death. He represented Pranpur (Vidhan Sabha constituency) thrice in 2000, 2010 and 2015 elections.

Political career
Singh was considered as one of the stalwarts of Bhartiya Janata Party. He defeated Mahendra Narayan Yadav in the 2010 assembly elections to Bihar Legislative Assembly and in 2015, became victorious once again by defeating Ishrat Parveen of Nationalist Congress Party. In early years of his political career, he was also associated with Akhil Bharatiya Vidyarthi Parishad, the student wing of Rashtriya Swayamsevak Sangh.

Death
He died in 2020. It was found that his death happened because of the complications associated with COVID -19. Though, he was recovered after being infected, but, he was hospitalized once again after some time, leading to his death.

References 

20th-century births
2020 deaths
Bharatiya Janata Party politicians from Bihar
Date of birth missing
People from Katihar district
Bihar MLAs 2000–2005
Bihar MLAs 2010–2015
Bihar MLAs 2015–2020